Franz Wohlfahrt may refer to:
Franz Wohlfahrt (composer) (1833–1884), German composer
Franz Wohlfahrt (footballer) (born 1964), Austrian footballer